Rosedale Union School District is a Kindergarten - 8th grade public school district in Bakersfield, California. The district has 9 schools, and serves Northwest Bakersfield.

References

External links

School districts in Kern County, California
School districts established in 1890
1890 establishments in California